Fake Tunes is the fourth studio album by American experimental rock band, Bear Hands. The album was released on May 10, 2019 through Spensive Sounds.

Release and promotion 
Two weeks after the release of Fake Tunes, Bear Hands opened for Twenty One Pilots during the second North American leg of The Bandito Tour. Bear Hands opened for Twenty One Pilots from May 12 to June 30, 2019. From October 8 to November 29, 2019, Bear Hands will co-headline with X Ambassadors in promotion of the album.

Singles 
The first single, "Back Seat Driver (Spirit Guide)", was released on April 5, 2018. The single was the highest charting and highest streaming single on the album, reaching number 21 on the Alternative Songs charts, specifically peaking at that place on June 9, 2018.

The second single, "Blue Lips" featuring backing vocals from Ursula Rose, was released on January 3, 2019. The single peaked at number 32 on the Billboard Alternative Songs charts during the week of March 23, 2019. The single was well received critically and described as having a range of influences in sound and style, ranging from indie rock, rap rock, and jangle pop.

Critical reception 

Writing for QRO Magazine, Ted Chase described that the album has the capability of being a major hit saying "perhaps they’re too artistic to be as big as the likes of Twenty One Pilots (who they recently toured with), and too tough to pin down, genre-wise. But that’s because they actually successfully mix their influences into something special." Chase gave the album an 8 out of 10.

Andrew Duncan, writing for Selective Memory magazine offered a more mixed review of Fake Tunes. Duncan said that the album sees Bear Hands "caught between a rock and a hard place. Too young to slow down but too adult to be reckless, that is the underlying presence within the songwriting of Fake Tunes. Bear Hands have always been an intriguing fixture in the indie rock world, yet Fake Tunes is a crossroads." Duncan gave Fake Tunes three stars out of five

Track listing

References

External links 
 
 

2019 albums
Bear Hands albums